This is a list of administrators and governors of Enugu State.
Enugu State was formed on 27 August 1991 when it was split from Anambra State.

See also
List of Governors of Anambra State
States of Nigeria
List of state governors of Nigeria

References

Enugu
Governors